Zeribet El Oued District is a district of Biskra Province, Algeria.

Municipalities
The district has 4 municipalities:
Zeribet El Oued
Khenguet Sidi Nadjil
El Feidh
Meziraa

External links
 Blog

Districts of Biskra Province